Jodi is a 2019 Indian Telugu-language romantic drama film written and directed by Vishwanath Aarigella. Produced by Sai Venkatesh Gurram and Patchva Padmaja, under the Bhavana Creations banner, the film stars Aadi Saikumar and Shraddha Srinath, and Vennela Kishore, Gollapaudi Maruthi Rao, Naresh and Sithara in supporting roles. It was released on 6 September 2019, and it received mostly negative reviews from critics and average reviews from the audience.

Plot 

Kapil, a system administrator, has a rocky relationship with his father after a disastrous bet on a cricket match. He falls in love with a French teacher name Kanchana Mala, who lives with her paternal aunt and uncle after her parents died.

When businessman Avinash accidentally hits Kanchana's grandfather with his car, Kapil chases Avinash down, and they take Kanchana's grandfather to the hospital. Kapil discovers that the victim is Kanchana Mala's grandfather, and he and Kanchana begin dating.

After a happy courtship, Kapil approaches Kanchana's uncle to announce their marriage. However, her uncle rejects Kapil's proposal due to his father's ideals. To prove himself to Kanchana's uncle, Kapil leaves his job and joins Suvarnabhoomi Farms and Lands.

Kapil gets into trouble with his new boss. A chance meeting with Avinash leads them to plot revenge against Kapil's boss, who has taken it upon himself to teach his new employee a lesson.

Cast 

 Aadi Saikumar as Kapil
 Shraddha Srinath as Kanchana Mala
 Shiju as Raju, Kanchana's Uncle
 Vennela Kishore as Kapil's boss
 Gollapaudi Maruthi Rao
 Sithara as Vasavi, Kanchana's Aunt, Raju's wife
 Naresh as Kapil's father
 Sathya as Kapil's friend
 Pradeep as Avinash
 Kedar Shankar as Kanchanamala's father and Naresh's friend
 Chinna as Naresh's friend
 Varshini Sounderajan as Madhu Priya

Soundtrack 

The soundtrack was composed by Phani Kalyan,

References

External links 

 

 Indian romantic drama films
2010s Telugu-language films
2019 films
2019 romantic drama films